Festina lente or speûde bradéōs is a classical adage and oxymoron meaning "make haste slowly" (sometimes rendered in English as "more haste, less speed").  It has been adopted as a motto numerous times, particularly by the emperors Augustus and Titus, the Medicis and the Onslows.

The original form of the saying,  speũde bradéōs, is Classical Greek, of which festina lente is the Latin translation. The words  and festina are second-person-singular present active imperatives, meaning "make haste", while  and lente are adverbs, meaning "slowly".

History

The Roman historian Suetonius, in De vita Caesarum, tells that Augustus deplored rashness in a military commander, thus "" was one of his favourite sayings:

Certain gold coins minted for Augustus bore images of a crab and a butterfly to attempt an emblem for the adage.  Other such visualizations include a hare in a snail shell; a chameleon with a fish; a diamond ring entwined with foliage; and perhaps most recognizably, a dolphin entwined around an anchor.

Cosimo I de' Medici, Grand Duke of Tuscany took festina lente as his motto and symbolised it with a sail-backed tortoise.  This emblem appears repeatedly throughout his Palazzo Vecchio where it was painted by the artist Giorgio Vasari.  There are about 100 instances in the palace decorations and frescos and there are now tours with the object of finding them all.

The Renaissance printer Aldus Manutius adopted the symbol of the dolphin and anchor as his printer's mark.  Erasmus (whose books were published by Manutius) featured the phrase in his Adagia and used it to compliment his printer: "Aldus, making haste slowly, has acquired as much gold as he has reputation, and richly deserves both."  Manutius showed Erasmus a Roman silver coin, given to him by Cardinal Bembo, which bore the dolphin-and-anchor symbol on the reverse side.

The adage was popular in the Renaissance era and Shakespeare alluded to it repeatedly.  In Love's Labour's Lost, he copied the crab and butterfly imagery with the characters Moth and Armado.

The French poet and critic Nicolas Boileau, in his Art poétique (The Art of Poetry) (1674) applied the dictum specifically to the work of the writer, whom he advised in those words: 

Jean de la Fontaine alluded to the motto in his famous fable of "The Hare and the Tortoise" (Fables, 1668–94), writing that the tortoise "with a prudent wisdom hastens slowly".

The Onslow family of Shropshire has the adage as its motto, generating a pun upon the family name: "on-slow".

The adage was a favourite of the influential judge, Sir Matthew Hale,

Meaning
The meaning of the phrase is that activities should be performed with a proper balance of urgency and diligence.  If tasks are rushed too quickly then mistakes are made and good long-term results are not achieved.  Work is best done in a state of flow in which one is fully engaged by the task and there is no sense of time passing.

Allusions
In physics, the name "Festina Lente Limit" has been applied to the Strong Confinement Limit, which is a mode of an atom laser in which the frequency of emission of the Bose–Einstein condensate is less than the confinement frequency of the trap.

Composer Arvo Pärt wrote Festina lente for strings and harp, in which some instruments play the melody at half-speed while others play it at double-speed, so the music is both fast and slow.

Goethe refers to both the proverb and Augustus' adoption of it in his poem Hermann und Dorothea (helpfully for poetry, the German rendition itself rhymes—"Eile mit Weile"):

The Lord Chancellor uses the phrase in W S Gilbert's Iolanthe: "Recollect yourself I pray, and be careful what you say — as the ancient Romans said, festina lente."

In Bram Stoker's 1897 novel Dracula, Dr. Van Helsing says of Count Dracula,He has all along, since his coming, been trying his power, slowly but surely; that big child-brain of his is working.  Well for us, it is, as yet, a child brain; for had he dared, at the first, to attempt certain things he would long ago have been beyond our power.  However, he means to succeed, and a man who has centuries before him can afford to wait and to go slow.  Festina lente may well be his motto.The novel Mr. Penumbra's 24-Hour Bookstore by Robin Sloan involves a secret society devoted to Aldus Manutius, whose members use "Festina lente" as a motto/greeting.

See also
The Tortoise and the Hare
Festina lente (bridge), a pedestrian bridge in Sarajevo

References

Adages
Latin mottos
Latin philosophical phrases